Ralph James may refer to:

 Ralph James (actor) (1924–1992), American voice and character actor
 Ralph James (coach) (1902–1981), American football and basketball coach
 Ralph A. James (1920–1973), American chemist
 Ralph Duncan James (1909–1979), Canadian mathematician
 Ralph K. James (1906–1994), United States Navy admiral